Strictispira coltrorum is a species of small sea snail, a marine gastropod mollusk in the family Pseudomelatomidae, the turrids and allies.

Description
The length of the shell attains 10.9 mm, its diameter 4 mm.

Distribution
This species occurs in the Atlantic Ocean off Espírito Santo, Brazil

References

External links
 Tippett D.L. (2006). The genus Strictispira in the western Atlantic (Gastropoda: Conoidea). Malacologia. 48(1–2): 43–64.
  Abdelkrim J., Aznar-Cormano L., Fedosov A., Kantor Y., Lozouet P., Phuong M., Zaharias P. & Puillandre N. (2018). Exon-capture based phylogeny and diversification of the venomous gastropods (Neogastropoda, Conoidea). Molecular Biology and Evolution. 35(10): 2355–2374
 Gastropods.com: Strictispira coltrorum

coltrorum
Gastropods described in 2006